District 13 of the Texas Senate is a senatorial district that currently serves portions of Fort Bend and Harris counties in the U.S. state of Texas.

The current Senator from District 13 is Borris Miles.

Top 5 biggest cities in district
District 13 has a population of 808,680 with 590,736 that is at voting age from the 2010 census.

District officeholders

Election history
Election history of District 21 from 1992.

Previous elections

2020

2016

2012

2010

2006

2002

1998

1994

1992

Notes

References

13
Fort Bend County, Texas
Harris County, Texas